Stenocoris is a genus of rice bugs in the family Alydidae. There are more than 20 described species in Stenocoris, found in Africa and the Americas,

Species
These 22 species belong to the genus Stenocoris:

 Stenocoris africanus Ahmad, 1965
 Stenocoris americanus Ahmad, 1965
 Stenocoris annulicornis (Signoret, 1861)
 Stenocoris apicalis (Westwood, 1842)
 Stenocoris braziliensis Ahmad, 1965
 Stenocoris claviformis Ahmad, 1965
 Stenocoris elegans (Blöte, 1937)
 Stenocoris erraticus (Blöte, 1937)
 Stenocoris ethiopis Ahmad, 1965
 Stenocoris fabricii Ahmad, 1965
 Stenocoris filiformis (Fabricius, 1775)
 Stenocoris furcifera (Westwood, 1842)
 Stenocoris maculosus (Blöte, 1937)
 Stenocoris pallidus (Blöte, 1937)
 Stenocoris phthisicus (Gerstaecker, 1873)
 Stenocoris schaeferi Montemayor & Dellapé, 2011
 Stenocoris similis Blöte, 1937
 Stenocoris sordidus (Blöte, 1937)
 Stenocoris southwoodi Ahmad, 1965
 Stenocoris stali Ahmad, 1965
 Stenocoris tipuloides (De Geer, 1773) (neotropical rice bug)
 Stenocoris v-nigrum (Blöte, 1937)

References

Further reading

External links

 

Articles created by Qbugbot
Alydinae
Pentatomomorpha genera